The Central District of Malekshahi County is a district (bakhsh) in Malekshahi County, Ilam Province, Iran. At the 2006 census, its population was 18,326, in 3,568 families.  The District has one city: Arakvaz.  The District has two rural districts (dehestan): Chamzey Rural District and Shuhan Rural District.

References 

Districts of Ilam Province
Malekshahi County